Howling Trains and Barking Dogs is the ninth and final album by Cindy Bullens, released in 2010 on Blue Rose Records. It was produced by Bullens herself. This is her last album before the surgery and transition.

Track listing

"Love Gone Good" (Cindy Bullens, Bill Lloyd)	
"Can't Stop This Train" (Matraca Berg, Cindy Bullens)	
"In a Perfect World" (Cindy Bullens, Bill Lloyd)
"Labor of Love" (Cindy Bullens, Radney Foster)		
"All My Angels" (Cindy Bullens, Wendy Waldman)	
"Whistles and Bells" (Cindy Bullens, Radney Foster)
"I Didn't Know" (Al Anderson, Cindy Bullens)	
"Everywhere and Nowhere" (Cindy Bullens, Jimmy Tittle)	
"Let Jesus Do the Talking" (Cindy Bullens, Kye Fleming, Mary Ann Kennedy)	
"The Misty Hills of Tennessee" (Cindy Bullens)	
"Good at Being Gone" (Cindy Bullens)

Personnel
Cindy Bullens - vocals, acoustic guitar, electric guitar, mandolin, harmonica, percussion
David Mansfield - fiddle
Bob Colwell - accordion, keyboards, bass, organ, piano, Wurlitzer piano
Stephan B. Jones - bass, dobro, guitar, electric guitar
Justin Maxwell - bass, electric upright bass
Ginger Coté - drums, percussion
Reid Bullens-Crewe, Matraca Berg, Deborah Holland, Wendy Waldman, The Ordinaires, Bob Colwell - backing vocals

External links
https://www.discogs.com/Cindy-Bullens-Howling-Trains-And-Barking-Dogs/release/7000370
https://musicbrainz.org/release-group/8fde326a-4318-4ec4-bfd6-f204f2b17347
http://www.allmusic.com/album/howling-trains-and-barking-dogs-mw0001994069
https://www.washingtonpost.com/express/wp/2010/06/28/cindy-bullens-howling-trains-and-barking-dogs-review/
https://www.slantmagazine.com/music/review/cindy-bullens-howling-trains-and-barking-dogs

2010 albums